United States gubernatorial elections were held on November 5, 2002, in 36 states and two territories. The Republicans won eight seats previously held by the Democrats, as well as the seat previously held by Minnesota governor Jesse Ventura, who was elected on the Reform Party ticket but had since renounced his party affiliation. The Democrats won 10 seats previously held by the Republicans, as well as the seat previously held by Maine governor Angus King, an independent. The elections were held concurrently with the other United States elections of 2002.

Overall, the Republicans suffered a net loss of one seat while the Democrats made a net gain of three. The Republicans managed to maintain their majority of state governorships, but it was reduced to a margin of only two seats. The elections were notable for the sheer number of state governorships that changed parties – 20 in total, constituting more than half of the seats up for election. Additionally, a number of Democratic and Republican gains occurred in states that typically favor the other party; for instance, Republican candidates won the usually Democratic states of Maryland, Hawaii, Minnesota and Vermont, while Democratic governors were elected in Republican-leaning states like Wyoming, Tennessee, Oklahoma and Kansas. 

In addition to the elections held in 36 states, elections were also held in the unincorporated territories of Guam and the United States Virgin Islands. The Democrats held their seat in the United States Virgin Islands, while the Republicans won an open seat in Guam previously held by the Democrats.

Democratic gains
 Arizona – State Attorney General Janet Napolitano won an open seat held by term-limited Gov. Jane Dee Hull.
 Illinois – U.S. Representative Rod Blagojevich won an open seat held by retiring Gov. George H. Ryan, becoming the first Democratic governor of Illinois since 1976.
 Kansas – State Insurance Commissioner Kathleen Sebelius won an open seat held by term-limited Gov. Bill Graves.
 Maine – U.S. Representative John Baldacci won an open seat held by Independent term-limited Gov. Angus King.
 Michigan – State Attorney General Jennifer Granholm won an open seat held by term-limited Gov. John Engler.
 New Mexico – former U.S. Representative and U.S. Secretary of Energy Bill Richardson won an open seat held by term-limited Gov. Gary Johnson.
 Oklahoma – State Senator Brad Henry won an open seat held by term-limited Gov. Frank Keating.
 Pennsylvania – former Mayor of Philadelphia and DNC Chairman Ed Rendell won an open seat held by retiring Gov. Mark Schweiker.
 Tennessee – former Nashville Mayor Phil Bredesen won an open seat held by term-limited Gov. Don Sundquist.
 Wisconsin – State Attorney General Jim Doyle defeated incumbent Gov. Scott McCallum
 Wyoming – U.S. Attorney Dave Freudenthal won an open seat held by term-limited Gov. Jim Geringer.

Republican gains
 Alabama – U.S. Representative Bob Riley narrowly defeated incumbent Gov. Don Siegelman.
 Alaska – U.S. Senator Frank Murkowski won an open seat held by term-limited Gov. Tony Knowles.
 Georgia – State Senator Sonny Perdue defeated incumbent Gov. Roy Barnes and became first Republican Governor of Georgia since the 1870s.
 Guam – Territorial Legislative Majority Leader Felix Perez Camacho won an open seat held by term-limited Gov. Carl T.C. Gutierrez.
 Hawaii – Former Maui Mayor Linda Lingle won an open seat held by term-limited Gov. Benjamin Cayetano, becoming the first Republican Governor since 1962.
 Maryland – U.S. Representative Robert Ehrlich won an open seat held by term-limited Gov. Parris Glendening, becoming the first Republican Governor since Spiro Agnew in 1966.
 Minnesota – State House Majority Leader Tim Pawlenty won an open seat held by retiring Independent Gov. Jesse Ventura in difficult, three-way (GOP, DFL and IMP) race.
 New Hampshire – Businessman Craig Benson won an open seat held by retiring Gov. Jeanne Shaheen.
 South Carolina – U.S. Representative Mark Sanford defeated incumbent Gov. Jim Hodges.
 Vermont – State Treasurer Jim Douglas won an open seat held by retiring Gov. Howard Dean.

Election results

States

Territories and federal district

Closest races 
States where the margin of victory was under 1%:
 Alabama, 0.2%
 Oklahoma, 0.7%

States where the margin of victory was under 5%:
 Arizona, 1.0%
 Wyoming, 2.0%
 Vermont, 2.5%
 Oregon, 2.9%
 Tennessee, 3.1%
 Wisconsin, 3.7%
 Maryland, 3.9%
 Michigan, 4.0%
 Hawaii, 4.6%
 Massachusetts, 4.8%
 California, 4.9%

States where the margin of victory was under 10%:
 Georgia, 5.2%
 Maine, 5.7%
 South Carolina, 5.9%
 Arkansas, 6.1%
 Illinois, 7.1%
 Kansas, 7.8%
 Minnesota, 7.9%
 Iowa, 8.2%
 Pennsylvania, 9.0%
 Rhode Island, 9.5%

See also
2002 United States elections
2002 United States Senate elections
2002 United States House of Representatives elections

Notes

References

External links
Election 2002 – Governor. CNN.